Our Colline's a Treasure is an album by jazz pianist Mal Waldron recorded in 1987 and released on the Italian Soul Note label.

Reception
The Allmusic review awarded the album 3 stars.

Track listing
All compositions by Mal Waldron
 "Spaces" — 9:18 
 "Our Colline's a Treasure" — 6:20 
 "Ches Pascale" — 5:43 
 "The Git Go" — 13:27 
 "Because of You I Live Again" — 7:27 
Recorded at Barigozzi Studio in Milan, Italy on April 28 & 30, 1987

Personnel
Mal Waldron — piano
Leonard Jones — bass
Sangoma Everett — drums

References

1987 albums
Mal Waldron albums
Black Saint/Soul Note albums